This is a list of fictional countries from published works of fiction (books, films, television series, games, etc.).  Fictional works describe all the countries in the following list as located somewhere  as we know it – as opposed to underground, inside the planet, on another world, or during a different "age" of the planet with a different physical geography.

A

B

C

D

E

F

G

H

I

J

K

L

M

N

O

P

Q

R

S

T

U

V

W

X

Y

Z

See also
 List of fictional countries by region

References

External links